Spinning Wheels is a former stop on the Overbrook branch of the Port Authority of Allegheny County's light rail network.  The stop was named for the adjacent former site of an indoor roller skating rink.  The stop was closed when the Overbrook line was shut down in 1993, and its shelter and platforms removed when the line was rebuilt in 2004.  A Busy Beaver hardware store currently occupies the site of the skating rink.

References

Former Port Authority of Allegheny County stations
Railway stations closed in 1993